This is also the ancient Greek name of a small island off Naples, site of the Castel dell'Ovo.

Megaris was a small but populous state of ancient Greece, west of Attica and north of Corinthia, whose inhabitants were adventurous seafarers, credited with deceitful propensities.  The capital, Megara, was famous for white marble and fine clay. Mount Geraneia dominates the center of the region. The island of Salamis was originally under the control of Megara, before it was lost to Athens in the late 7th century BCE.

Province

The province of Megaris or Megarida ( or ) was one of the provinces of the East Attica Prefecture. Its territory corresponded with that of the current municipalities Aspropyrgos, Eleusis, Mandra-Eidyllia and Megara. It was abolished in 2006.

References

Sources

 
Ancient Greek geography
Provinces of Greece
Historical regions
Historical regions in Greece